Conference Indiana (CI) is an athletic conference within the Indiana High School Athletic Association. Conference Indiana was initially formed from the union of surviving members of the Central Suburban Athletic Conference (CSAC) and the South Central Conference (SCC) after the departure of members to the Metropolitan Interscholastic Conference (MIC).

Original membership included all six non-MIC township schools in Indianapolis (Decatur Central, Pike, Lawrence Central, Franklin Central, Southport, and Perry Meridian high schools). Also included were the four largest non-MIC high schools in south central Indiana at the time of conference formation:  Columbus North, Bloomington South, Bloomington North, and Martinsville high schools.

Decatur Central and Martinsville left the conference after the 2005-2006 school year to join the Mid-State Conference, citing travel issues.  After Lawrence Central and Pike joined the MIC in 2013, MIC castaways Terre Haute North and South joined as trial football-only members, gaining full membership in 2014. The conference has produced a number of NBA players all drafted in the 1st round including Jared Jeffries in 2002, Sean May in 2006, Courtney Lee in 2008, Jeff Teague in 2009 and Marquis Teague in 2012.  Robert Vaden was taken in the 2nd round of the 2009 draft.

Member schools

Current members

 Football only members in 2013, all other sports joined in 2014.

Former members

Membership timeline

State titles

Bloomington North Cougars (3)
 1977 Wrestling
 1980 Boys Cross Country
 1997 Boys Basketball

Bloomington South Panthers (29)
Titles won before 1972 were won as Bloomington High School

 1904 Boys Track & Field
 1919 Boys Basketball
 2009 Boys Basketball (4A)
 2011 Boys Basketball (4A)
 1933 Wrestling
 1934 Wrestling
 1939 Wrestling
 1941 Wrestling
 1942 Wrestling
 1943 Wrestling
 1950 Wrestling
 1953 Wrestling
 1957 Wrestling
 1969 Wrestling
 1970 Wrestling
 1971 Wrestling
 1972 Wrestling
 1973 Wrestling
 1978 Wrestling
 1972 Baseball
 1993 Football (5A)
 1998 Football (5A)
 1939 Boys Golf
 1970 Boys Swimming & Diving
 1971 Boys Swimming & Diving
 1972 Boys Swimming & Diving
 1990 Girls Golf
 2014 Girls Softball (4A)
 1975 Girls Tennis

Columbus North Bulldogs (39)
Titles won before 1973 credited as Columbus High School
 1934 Boys Golf
 2014 Boys Golf
 1959 Boys Swimming & Diving
 1960 Boys Swimming & Diving
 1961 Boys Swimming & Diving
 1963 Boys Swimming & Diving
 1964 Boys Swimming & Diving
 1965 Boys Swimming & Diving
 1985 Boys Swimming & Diving
 1998 Boys Swimming & Diving
 1999 Boys Swimming & Diving
 2000 Boys Swimming & Diving
 2002 Boys Cross-Country
 2003 Boys Cross-Country
 2009 Boys Cross-Country
 2010 Boys Cross-Country
 2011 Boys Cross-Country
 2020 Boys Cross-Country
 1967 Boys Gymnastics (While Columbus HS)
 1968 Boys Gymnastics (While Columbus HS)
 1969 Boys Gymnastics (While Columbus HS)
 1970 Boys Gymnastics (While Columbus HS)
 1972 Boys Gymnastics (While Columbus HS)
 1973 Boys Gymnastics
 1975 Boys Gymnastics
 1976 Boys Gymnastics
 1977 Boys Gymnastics
 1978 Boys Gymnastics
 1979 Boys Gymnastics
 1981 Boys Gymnastics
 1982 Boys Gymnastics
 2012 Boys Soccer (2A)
 1973 Girls Gymnastics
 1974 Girls Gymnastics
 2016 Girls Gymnastics
 2015 Girls Basketball (4A)
 2009 Girls Cross-Country 
 1986 Girls Swimming & Diving
 2021 Girls Cross-Country

Southport Cardinals (10)
 1940 Wrestling
 1951 Wrestling
 1954 Wrestling
 1955 Wrestling
 1964 Wrestling
 1970 Boys Cross Country
 1971 Boys Cross Country
 1975 Boys Cross Country
 1980 Girls Basketball
 1981 Girls Cross Country

Terre Haute North Vigo Patriots (2)
1972 Boys Cross Country
1974 Baseball

Terre Haute South Vigo Braves (2)
2001 Girls Tennis
2002 Girls Basketball (4A)

1 Won while Conference Indiana Member.

Neighboring Conferences

 Blue Chip
 Central Indiana
 Hoosier
 Hoosier Crossroads

 Hoosier Heartland
 Hoosier Hills
 Indiana Crossroads
 Indianapolis Public

 Metropolitan Interscholastic
 Mid-State
 Patoka Lake
 Southern Athletic

 Southern Athletic
 Southwest Indiana Athletic
 Tri-River
 White River

References

Indiana high school athletic conferences
High school sports conferences and leagues in the United States
Education in Bartholomew County, Indiana
Education in Marion County, Indiana
Education in Monroe County, Indiana
Bloomington, Indiana
Columbus, Indiana
Sports competitions in Indianapolis